Kamakshi Ekambareshwarar Temple is a Hindu temple at Karamana, a suburb of Trivandrum in Kerala, India. In the temple, the main deities are Shiva and Parvathi, and the other devotees are Lord Ganapathy, Muruga, Nagaraja, Ujjayini Mahakali Amman and Madan Thampuran.

References

Hindu temples in Thiruvananthapuram district